Hydnellum fuscoindicum is a species of tooth fungus in the genus Hydnellum. It is found in the Pacific Northwest in moss around western hemlocks. It produces fruit bodies with a violet-black cap, violet flesh, and violet spines on the cap underside. The odor and taste are very farinaceous. The fungus was first described by Kenneth A. Harrison in 1964 as a species of Hydnum, then transferred to Sarcodon in 1967 by Rudolph Arnold Maas Geesteranus. He placed this species in section Violacei of Sarcodon, along with H. fuligineoviolaceum and H. joeides.

References

External links
 
 

Fungi described in 1964
Fungi of the United States
fuscoindicum
Fungi without expected TNC conservation status